Iz*One (stylized as IZ*ONE) was a South Korean–Japanese girl group formed through the Mnet reality competition show Produce 48. The group was composed of twelve members: Jang Won-young, Sakura Miyawaki, Jo Yu-ri, Choi Ye-na, An Yu-jin, Nako Yabuki, Kwon Eun-bi, Kang Hye-won, Hitomi Honda, Kim Chae-won, Kim Min-ju and Lee Chae-yeon. The group was co-managed by Off the Record and Swing Entertainment.

Iz*One made their official debut on October 29, 2018, with their first extended play (EP) Color*Iz. Upon its release, the group received immediate commercial success, selling over 225,000 units and peaking at number 2 on South Korea's Gaon Album Chart. In addition, both the EP and its lead single "La Vie en Rose" charted on Billboard World Albums and World Digital Songs respectively. The early success subsequently hailed them as the New Artist of the Year at several awards ceremonies, including Golden Disc Awards and Seoul Music Awards.

The group's Japanese debut single, "Suki to Iwasetai", was released on February 6, 2019, under UMG's EMI Records label. Peaking at number 2 on Oricon Singles Chart and with over 250,000 unit sales, the single was certified Platinum by the Recording Industry Association of Japan (RIAJ).

Throughout the group's active years, they released two studio albums (one Korean and one Japanese), seven extended plays (four in Korean and three in Japanese). Despite initial talks of a possible contract extension, they officially disbanded on April 29, 2021.

Name 
The group's name, Iz*One (stylized in all caps), was suggested by netizens through the official Produce 48 website and chosen by CJ ENM. "IZ" is a numeronym for the number 12, a homage to their twelve members, while "ONE" indicates that they are one as a group. The asterisk (*) between "IZ" and "ONE" symbolizes the astrological signs of the zodiac.

History

Formation through Produce 48 

Iz*One was formed through the reality competition show Produce 48, which aired on Mnet from June 15 to August 31, 2018. The show was billed as a collaboration between the Korean Produce 101 franchise and the Japanese idol AKB48 Group. Out of an initial ninety-six contestants, the final twelve were announced via live television broadcast.

Prior to appearing on the show, several members had already been active in the entertainment industry. Hitomi Honda previously made her debut as a member of AKB48. Prior to joining HKT48, member Sakura Miyawaki had appeared in a Shiki Theatre Company musical production of The Lion King (2008–2009), and member Nako Yabuki was in the 2005 film Touch, followed by roles in various Japanese television dramas and commercials. Kwon Eun-bi previously debuted with Ye-A in 2014 under the stage name Kazoo, but later left the group. Kang Hye-won was a potential member for the groups DayDay and The Ark. Lee Chae-yeon previously competed in SBS' K-pop Star 3, and JYP Entertainment's own reality competition show Sixteen. Jo Yu-ri was a contestant in the past 2017 Mnet competition show Idol School, where she came in fifteenth place. Kim Min-ju had appeared as an actress in music videos and Korean dramas, notably the 2018 MBC television series Tempted, wherein she portrayed the role of the young Choi Soo-ji (Moon Ga-young). An Yu-jin had also appeared as an actress in commercials and music videos, most notably in an Acuvue Vita commercial.

In September 2018, Off The Record announced that they would be taking over the management of Iz*One from Stone Music and Pledis. All three Japanese members halted activities with their respective 48 groups to focus on activities with Iz*One.

2018: Korean debut with Color*Iz 

The group's debut extended play (EP) Color*Iz was released on October 29, 2018, with "La Vie en Rose" as its lead single. A debut showcase concert, entitled Color*Iz Show-Con, was held in conjunction with the album's release at the Olympic Hall in Seoul, South Korea, in which the tickets to the showcase were sold out within a minute of being on sale. Iz*One's first music program performance was aired on November 1 on Mnet's M Countdown. They garnered their first music program win a week later on M Countdown, ten days after their official debut, and broke the record for the fastest girl group to receive a music program win at the time. The EP recorded a sale of over 34,000 units in its first day of release, setting a new record for the highest number of albums sold on the first day of a girl group's debut release, while the music video for the lead single "La Vie en Rose" achieved more than 4.5million views within 24 hours of its release on YouTube, making it the most-watched debut music video by a Korean act in 24 hours at the time. The EP peaked second on the Gaon Album Chart and sold over 225,000 copies. The EP received Platinum certification by the Korea Music Content Association (KMCA) on July 9, 2020, or 20 months upon its release, after recording more than 250,000 shipment figures. The group ended their promotions for Color*Iz on November 23 on KBS's Music Bank. With the group's early commercial success, Iz*One won the "New Artist of the Year" category at the several awards ceremonies, including Mnet Asian Music Awards, Golden Disc Awards, and Seoul Music Awards. Their debut was considered by Billboard as one of the best K-pop debuts of 2018. On December 5, Iz*One performed at the 2018 FNS Music Festival in Japan, the group's first overseas activity.

On December 6, Off The Record announced that Iz*One had signed a recording contract with Universal Music Japan's EMI Records label, in preparation for the group's Japanese debut which was revealed to be on February 6, 2019. On December 15, Sakura Miyawaki and Nako Yabuki returned to Japan for HKT48's 8th anniversary concert. Although the news received criticism initially, Off The Record responded that the two would participate in the concert as Iz*One members.

2019: Japanese debut, subsequent releases and temporary hiatus 

Iz*One held their Japanese debut show-con in Tokyo Dome City Hall on January 20, where they performed their debut Japanese single "Suki to Iwasetai" for the first time. The music video for the single was released on January 25, five days after the event, while the single itself was released on February 6. It peaked at number 2 on both the Oricon Singles Chart and the Billboard Japan Hot 100, selling over 200,000 copies on its first week. On March 8, it was certified Platinum by the Recording Industry Association of Japan (RIAJ) with over 250,000 unit sales, the group's first Platinum certification.

On March 9, English DJ and producer Jonas Blue released a new version of his 2018 hit single "Rise", featuring Iz*One on vocals.

The group released their second EP titled Heart*Iz on April 1. Domestic pre-orders for the EP exceeded 200,000 copies. Upon its release, it topped in both the Gaon Album and Oricon Overseas Album Charts, and sold more than 130,000 copies in the first week of its sale, a new record for a K-pop girl group at the time. The EP was then certified Platinum on October 10 by the KMCA after selling more than 250,000 shipment figures. It peaked at number 6 on Billboard World Albums chart. Meanwhile, the lead single "Violeta" from the EP peaked at numbers 18 and 5 on Gaon Digital Chart and Billboard K-pop Hot 100 respectively. It also charted at number 8 on Billboard World Digital Songs. The song received its first music program win on SBS MTV's The Show on April 9.

Iz*One began their first headlining tour titled Eyes on Me at the Jamsil Indoor Stadium in Seoul, South Korea. After tickets for the first two initial dates–June 8 and 9–were sold out, Off The Record added an additional concert date on June 7. During the tour, they performed two new songs, "Ayayaya" and "So Curious", as sub-units. Overall, the group visited eight cities in five territories, with 81,000 attendance in total. On July 6, the group participated in the annual music festival KCON, held at the Madison Square Garden in New York City, their first U.S. performance.

The group released their second Japanese single, "Buenos Aires", on June 26. The single debuted atop on both Japanese domestic charts–the Oricon Singles Chart and the Billboard Japan Hot 100. It received its Platinum certification by the RIAJ in July 2019. On September 25, Iz*One released their third Japanese single titled "Vampire". Like the previous release, the single topped on both domestic charts in Japan with its first week sales exceeding 200,000 copies; leading to its Gold certification by the RIAJ. It is also the group's only Japanese release to chart on Billboard K-pop Hot 100, peaking at number 52. Following their commercial success, the group became Oricon's best-selling new artist for the first half of 2019, accounting an estimated earning of ¥510 million (₩5.5 billion) of total sales in Japan between December 10, 2018, and June 9, 2019. Iz*One participated in the 2019 Tokyo Girls Collection events held in three consecutive cities, the first guest performer to do so.

The group was scheduled to release their first studio album on November 11. However, the release was postponed due to the Mnet vote manipulation investigation. Investigations revealed that the Produce 48 producer Ahn Joon-young had selected the twelve members of Iz*One from the top 20 just before the airing of the finale. As a result, Iz*One's showcases, promotions, and several guest appearances were cancelled or put on hold, which included the release of their concert film, Eyes on Me: The Movie, and their Japanese promotions.

2020–2021: Bloom*Iz, Oneiric Diary, Twelve, One-reeler / Act IV, final concert and disbandment 
On January 6, 2020, Iz*One members' agencies and CJ ENM reached an agreement that the group would resume their activities. On February 17, they released their first studio album Bloom*Iz and its single "Fiesta". On February 23, the album broke the then-record for the highest first-week sales on Hanteo for an album by a girl group with 356,313 copies; it is also the first album by a girl group to surpass the 300,000 copies mark in Hanteo's history. Bloom*Iz was certified Platinum by the Korea Music Content Association (KMCA) on April 9 after selling more than 390,000 shipment figures. In addition to domestic achievements, Bloom*Iz also topped Oricon Overseas Album Chart, following their previous two EPs.

On June 15, Iz*One released their third EP, Oneiric Diary, and its lead single "Secret Story of the Swan". The single's music video was originally scheduled to be released on the same day, but was postponed to June 16. The group held a comeback showcase to promote the EP on Mnet's second channel M2. Oneiric Diary peaked at number 2 and has recorded over 510,000 sales on the Gaon Album Chart. It is one of the first two albums by a girl group to be certified Double Platinum by the KMCA, the other the one being Twice's More & More. On September 13, Iz*One held their first online concert titled "Oneiric Theater". On October 21, the group released their first Japanese studio album Twelve. The album debuted atop the Oricon Albums Chart. On December 7, Iz*One released their fourth EP, One-reeler / Act IV, accompanied by its lead single "Panorama". The EP debuted at number one on the Gaon Album Chart.

On January 26, 2021, Iz*One released a promotional single titled "D-D-Dance" for Universe, a mobile application. On February 11, the group announced that they would hold their final online concert named "One, The Story" on March 13 and 14 ahead of their contract expiration in April, but the announcement on its extension was not yet announced. On February 15, 2021, 5 selected Iz*One members (Kwon Eun-bi, Sakura Miyawaki, Kim Min-ju, Jo Yu-ri and Jang Won-young) participated in the release of a promotional single, “Zero:Attitude” alongside the artists Soyou (who previously trained the group in Produce 48) and pH-1. The song was released in collaboration with Pepsi and Starship, as a part of their PEPSI X STARSHIP campaign. Iz*One participated in the compilation album Rewind : Blossom and remade Roo'ra's popular song 3!4!.

On April 29, 2021, Iz*One officially disbanded after the end of their contract. When the group's disbandment was announced, the official fanbase of the group, WIZ*ONE, started an initiative called Parallel Universe on April 21, 2021, in an attempt to prevent the group from disbanding. The name "Parallel Universe" was chosen to pay homage to a song with the same title that was released during the One, The Story concert. The initiative raised ₩1,000,000,000 (roughly US$900,000), its funding goal, but despite the support from the entire WIZ*ONE community, the initiative failed, and Iz*One disbanded as planned.

On June 19, CJ ENM confirmed that negotiations were underway to potentially relaunch the group, in consultation with the agencies which manage the members. Despite having initial discussions of the relaunch, the group's relaunch has fallen through as of July 6, and the group's re-debut has been cancelled.

Endorsements 
Prior to debut, Iz*One had endorsed and collaborated with multiple brands including Overhit, Salewa, and Skoolooks. After debut, brands Iz*One endorsed and collaborated with include G-Market, Fever Basket, Olive Young Colorgram:TOK, Sudden Attack, Miche Bloomin', and PepsiCo. The group had also featured in magazines such as Non-no and Elle.

Members 
Members are listed in Korean name format, except for Japanese members. For Japanese members, their names are listed in Western order and both their Japanese and Korean names are listed. 
 Kwon Eun-bi – leader
 Sakura Miyawaki
 Kang Hye-won
 Choi Ye-na
 Lee Chae-yeon()
 Kim Chae-won
 Kim Min-ju
 Nako Yabuki
 Hitomi Honda
 Jo Yu-ri
 An Yu-jin 
 Jang Won-young

Discography 

 Bloom*Iz (2020)
 Twelve (2020)

Filmography

Film

Reality shows

Concerts

Concert tours 
 Iz*One 1st Concert "Eyes On Me" (2019)

Standalone concerts 
 Color*Iz Show-Con Showcase (2018)
 Iz*One Japan Debut Showcase 1st Single "Suki to Iwasetai" Release Commemoration Event (2019)

Online concerts 
 Iz*One 1st Online Concert "ONEIRIC THEATER" (2020)
 Iz*One 2nd Online Concert "One, The Story" (2021)

Awards and nominations

Notes

References

External links 

 

 
K-pop music groups
Musical groups established in 2018
South Korean girl groups
South Korean dance music groups
South Korean pop music groups
Musical groups from Seoul
Swing Entertainment artists
Singing talent show winners
Produce 101
Produce 48 contestants
2018 establishments in South Korea
Korean-language singers of Japan
Japanese-language singers of South Korea
MAMA Award winners
Melon Music Award winners
Universal Music Japan artists
2021 disestablishments in South Korea
Musical groups disestablished in 2021